Sublett is an unincorporated community in Magoffin County, Kentucky, United States.  It lies along Route 7 southeast of the city of Salyersville, the county seat of Magoffin County.  Its elevation is 883 feet (269 m).

References

Unincorporated communities in Magoffin County, Kentucky
Unincorporated communities in Kentucky
Coal towns in Kentucky